BS16 may refer to:
 BS16, a BS postcode area for Bristol, England
 BS 16 Specification for telegraph material, a British Standard
 Bonomi BS.16 Allievo Bonomi, a primary glider